al-Hassan al-Dakhil (for "the one who entered") was the grandfather of Sharif ibn Ali the founder of the 'Alawid dynasty, which is the current Moroccan royal family. It is commonly believed that he was taken to Morocco from the town of Yanbu in the Hejaz at the end of the 13th century by the inhabitants of Tafilalt to be their Imam at the behest of Abu Ibrahim Al Omari. They were hoping that, as he was a descendant of Muhammad, his presence would help to improve their date palm crops thanks to his barakah (an Islamic term meaning a sense of divine presence or charisma).

References

 Tafilalt : Sijilmassa et les ksours Par : Aboulkacem CHEBRI at www.zizvalley.com

13th-century Moroccan people
H
13th-century Islamic religious leaders
13th-century Arabs